Salvelinus neocomensis is an extinct deepwater trout species only known from three specimens fished in  Lake Neuchâtel (Neuenburgersee) in 1896, 1902 and 1904.

Extinction
This rare endemic trout lived in the great depths of the lake, below . It had fins without white margins and yellowish flanks, which earned it the local name Jaunet. Research undertaken in the 1950s and 2003 failed to find evidence of the survival of this species after the last reported specimen.

References

External links
Photo of Salvelinus neocomensis
Revue Suisse de Zoologie - Salvelinus evasus

necomensis
Lake Neuchâtel
Cold water fish
Fish extinctions since 1500
Taxa named by Jörg Freyhof
Taxa named by Maurice Kottelat
Fish described in 2005